The Minister for Climate Change is a minister in the government of New Zealand with responsibility for climate change policy. The position was formally established in 2005 as Minister responsible for Climate Change Issues, but was preceded by the informal role of Convenor of the Ministerial Group on Climate Change, which was held by the Minister of Energy Pete Hodgson.

The present Minister is James Shaw.

Responsibilities
The Minister for Climate Change has direct responsibility for the overall climate change policy direction at the domestic and international level. This includes responsibility for the New Zealand Emissions Trading Scheme under the Climate Change Response Act 2002 and for setting emissions budgets and preparing emissions reduction and national adaptation plans under the Climate Change Response (Zero Carbon) Amendment Act 2019.

Under the United Nations Framework Convention on Climate Change, the Minister is responsible for representing New Zealand in international negotiations on climate change.

List of ministers

Minister for Climate Change
Key

Minister for International Climate Change Negotiations
Separate ministerial responsibility for International Climate Change Negotiations was established under the Fifth National Government, first through an Associate Minister role and then as a full Minister. The responsibilities associated with this portfolio were incorporated within the Climate Change Issues portfolio in 2012, after a brief period in which Tim Groser held both portfolios. At the time, Prime Minister John Key stated that the reason for the change in title was to address diplomatic misconceptions: "The reality is it partly in the sense that when he turns up at this meetings, people look at him and say `if you are the associate minister, where is the minister?' And of course when it comes to international negotiations, he is the minister."

References

External links
New Zealand Ministry for the Environment

Climate Change
Climate change in New Zealand
New Zealand